Fareed Peta is a village in the Etcherla Mandalam in Srikakulam District in the state of Andhra Pradesh in India.

Geography
Fareed Peta is the biggest village within the Etcherla Mandalam. The village is just 2.5 km from the town of Srikakulam.

Fareed Peta is a village in Etcherla Mandal in the Srikakulam District of the Andhra Pradesh State in India. It belongs to the Andhra Region. Located 6 km from the District Headquarters in Srikakulam, Fareed Peta is 3 km from Etcherla and 674 km from the state capital of Hyderabad.

Fareed Peta's pin code is 532410 and the Postal Head Office is located in Etcherla.

Etcherla (2 km), Ibrahimbad ( 3 km ), Tholapi ( 3 km ), Kusalapuram ( 3 km ), and Domam ( 3 km ) are all nearby villages to Fareed Peta. Srikakulam, Amadalavalasa, Rajam  and Palasa Kasibugga are cities all nearby the small town.

Fareed Peta is more specifically located near the Bay of Bengal. The village is surrounded by the Ponduru Mandal towards the West, Srikakulam Mandal towards the East, Laveru Mandal towards West, and Amadalavalasa Mandal towards the North.

Telugu is the most dominant language spoken.

References 

Villages in Srikakulam district